On 23 February 2021, 79 inmates were killed and several others were injured in riots that took place simultaneously in four prisons in Ecuador. Authorities gave gang rivalry in an overcrowded prison system as the cause. The violence happened in prisons located in the Guayas, Azuay and Cotopaxi provinces, which contain nearly 70% of the total prison population in the country.

Background
According to officials, the riot began as several rival prison gangs were fighting for leadership and they clashed inside detention centers around the country. Authorities claim that the fight for leadership began back in December when Jorge Luis Zambrano "Rasquiña", leader of Los Choneros, the most powerful gang within Ecuadorian prisons, was murdered in a shopping mall in Manta, Ecuador, a few months after being released. The riots are reported to have been precipitated by a weapon search carried out on the day prior to the riots, where two firearms were seized from members of Los Choneros. The police believe that these firearms were going to be used to kill the leaders of the other four prison gangs that had formed an alliance against Los Choneros. News of the firearms seizure alerted rival gang members and they promptly organized and launched a coordinated attack against the leaders of Los Choneros in four different prisons.

Casualties
Early reports confirmed that at least 50 inmates were killed following the violence. 800 police officers were required to quell the violence. Some photographs and videos were spread on social media which showed the inmates decapitated and dismembered in pools of blood.
On February 24, the death toll of the inmates increased to 79.

Response
Ecuadorian President Lenin Moreno declared a temporary state of emergency in the prison system, in order to control the prison violence.

In the wake of the clashes on 28 September, Ecuador plans to pardon up to 2,000 inmates.

November 2021 riots at Penitenciaria del Litoral
Reuters reports 68 dead at last count for the number of prisoners were killed in a new wave of terror and over a dozen seriously wounded in another event on the 13th of November 2021 riots at Penitenciaria del Litoral, on the outskirts of Guayaquil.

References

2021 in Ecuador
2021 riots
Prison uprisings in Ecuador
February 2021 events in South America
Massacres in Ecuador
Massacres in 2021
Cuenca, Ecuador
Guayaquil
Cotopaxi Province